Koo Kyo-hyun is a delegate of the Labor Party, and a convener of the Arbeit Workers Union in South Korea.

See also
Arbeit Workers Union

References

External links 
  
  

1977 births
Living people
Socialist Party (South Korea) politicians
New Progressive Party (South Korea) politicians
Leaders of the Labor Party (South Korea)